The 2020 season is United City Football Club's 9th in existence and 4th season in the top flight of Philippine football. This also marks as the first season the club plays as United City, after MMC Sportz took over the management of the club, which was formerly known as Ceres–Negros.

In addition to the Philippines Football League, United City as Ceres–Negros has also participated in the second-tier continental competition, the AFC Cup which was suspended due to the COVID-19 pandemic. United City intended to continue on participating in the AFC Cup under its new name, if the cancelled continental competition have resumed play.

Players
Note: Flags indicate national team as defined under FIFA eligibility rules. Players may hold more than one non-FIFA nationality.

Updated to match played on November 9, 2020.

Transfers 
Note: Flags indicate national team as defined under FIFA eligibility rules. Players may hold more than one non-FIFA nationality.

Transfers in

Transfers out

Kits
Supplier: Grand Sport (Ceres–Negros), Montè Athletics (United City) / 
Sponsor: Ceres Liner (Ceres–Negros), MARC Manila Regenerative Center (United City)

Competitions

Overview

Philippines Football League

Standings 

Results summary

Results by round

Matches

AFC Champions League

Qualifying play-offs

AFC Cup

Group stage 

The group stage draw was held on December 10, 2019 at the AFC House in Kuala Lumpur, Malaysia. Ceres–Negros were drawn in Group G alongside Indonesian Liga 1 champions Bali United, Vietnamese V.League 1 third-placers Than Quảng Ninh, and Cambodian C-League winners Svay Rieng who qualified via play-offs.

Notes

References

External links 
  (Official website)
  (Official website as Ceres-Negros)

United City 2020
United City 2020